Forestview High School is a public high school in Gastonia, North Carolina, United States. It is part of the Gaston County Schools district.

References

External links 
 

Gastonia, North Carolina
Schools in Gaston County, North Carolina
Public high schools in North Carolina